INS Vikrant is an aircraft carrier in service with Indian Navy. The carrier is the first to be built in India and was constructed by the Cochin Shipyard Limited (CSL) in Kerala. The namesake Vikrant is a tribute to India's first aircraft carrier INS Vikrant (1961),   Vikrant means "courageous" in Sanskrit. The motto of the ship, "जयेम सं युधिस्पृधः"(Sanskrit), means "I defeat those who fight against me".

Work on the ship's design began in 1999, and the keel was laid in 2009. The carrier was floated out of dry dock on 29 December 2011 and launched on 12 August 2013. Basin trials were completed in December 2020, and sea trials started in August 2021. Its commissioning ceremony was held on 2 September 2022. Aircraft flight trials will be completed in 2023.

It has a hospital complex, cabins for female officers, two football field-sized flight decks,  of corridors, and  eight generators capable of lighting up a city of 2 million people.

Background
In 1999, Defence Minister George Fernandes authorised the development and construction of an aircraft carrier, INS Vikrant, under the Project 71 Air Defence Ship (ADS). By that time, given the ageing Sea Harrier fleet, the letter of intent called for a carrier that would carry more modern jet fighters. In 2001, Cochin Shipyard Limited (CSL) released a graphic illustration showing a  STOBAR (Short Take-Off But Arrested Recovery) design with a pronounced ski jump. The aircraft carrier project finally received formal government approval in January 2003. By then, design updates called for a  carrier to operate the Mikoyan MiG-29K. India opted for a three-carrier fleet consisting of one carrier battle group stationed on each seaboard, and a third carrier held in reserve, in order to continuously protect both its flanks, to protect economic interests and mercantile traffic, and to provide humanitarian platforms in times of disasters, since a carrier can provide a self-generating supply of fresh water, medical assistance or engineering expertise to populations in need for assistance.

In August 2006, Chief of the Naval Staff Admiral Arun Prakash stated that the designation for the vessel had been changed from Air Defence Ship (ADS) to Indigenous Aircraft Carrier (IAC). The euphemistic ADS had been adopted in planning stages to ward off concerns about a naval build-up. Final revisions to the design increased the displacement of the carrier from 37,500 tons to over 45,000 tons.

Design

It features a STOBAR configuration. It can carry an air group of up to thirty-six aircraft, including 26 fixed-wing combat aircraft, and a mix of Dhruv MK-III, Sikorsky MH-60R and Kamov Ka-31 helicopters. The Ka-31 will fulfil the airborne early warning (AEW) role, MH-60R will provide anti-surface and anti-submarine warfare (ASW) capabilities, and Dhruv will be used mainly for search and rescue operations.

Vikrant is powered by four General Electric LM2500+ gas turbines on two shafts, generating over 80 megawatts (110,000 hp) of power. The gearboxes for the carriers were designed and supplied by Elecon Engineering.

The ship's combat management system (CMS) was developed by Tata Advanced Systems. It is the first CMS developed by a private company for the Indian Navy and was handed over to the Navy on 28 March 2019.

Carrier air group

Earlier, the Indian Navy considered fielding MiG-29K, and LCA Navy on Vikrant. At the same time, in 2009, the then navy Chief Admiral Nirmal Kumar Verma hinted that the Navy was carrying out a concept study for a more capable naval fighter, which turned out to be the HAL TEDBF, unveiled at 2021 Aero India airshow. In June 2012, Flight Global reported that the Indian Navy was considering the purchase of Dassault Rafale M (Naval variant) for Vikrant. The Rafale was by then declared the winner of IAF's MMRCA competition. In 2016, the Navy announced that the Tejas was overweight for carrier operations, and other alternatives would be looked at. In 2017, a request for proposal was issued for 57 "Multi-Role Carrier Borne Fighters", which was later cut down to 26 fighters act as a stop gap measure until the TEDBF is developed. In December 2020, Boeing Defense, Space & Security, in coordination with the United States Navy, demonstrated F/A-18E/F Super hornet's capability to operate from STOBAR carrier.

In 2022, the Indian Navy began testing the Rafale M and Boeing F/A-18E/F Super Hornet at a shore-based test facility at INS Hansa in Goa. The Navy started the fixed wing aviation trials with Tejas Naval variant. This to be followed by MiG-29K trials. 

On 6 February 2023, two arrested landings were made by MiG-29Ks, and also by a HAL Tejas (Naval Variant).

The prototype of the TEDBF is to be readied by 2026 and its production is to begin by 2032. Naval Tejas being a technology demonstrator development of niche technology for deck based fighter operations, paving the way for TEDBF.

Construction

Vikrant is the first aircraft carrier to be designed by the Warship Design Bureau (formerly Directorate of Naval Design) of the Indian Navy and the first warship to be built by Cochin Shipyard. Its construction involved participation of a large number of private and public firms.

The Defence Metallurgical Research Laboratory (DMRL) and Steel Authority of India Limited (SAIL) created facilities to manufacture the DMR 249 grade steel in India. Reportedly,  of three types of special steel for the hull, flight deck and floor compartments were manufactured at the Bokaro Steel Plant, Jharkhand, Bhilai Steel Plant, Chhattisgarh and Rourkela Steel Plant, Odisha. Due to this, Vikrant is the first ship of the Indian Navy to be built completely using domestically produced steel. The main switch board, steering gear and water tight hatches have been manufactured by Larsen & Toubro in Mumbai and Talegaon; high-capacity air conditioning and refrigeration systems have been manufactured in Kirloskar Group's plants in Pune; most pumps have been supplied by Best and Crompton; Bharat Heavy Electricals (BHEL) supplied the Integrated Platform Management System (IPMS), which is being installed by Avio, an Italian company; the gear box was supplied by Elecon Engineering; and the electrical cables are being supplied by Nicco Industries. Fincantieri provided consultancy for the propulsion package while Russia's Nevskoye Design Bureau designed the aviation complex.

The keel for Vikrant was laid by Defence Minister A.K. Antony at the Cochin Shipyard on 28 February 2009. The ship uses modular construction, with 874 blocks joined for the hull. By the time the keel was laid, 423 blocks weighing over 8,000 tons had been completed. In August 2011, the Defence Ministry reported to the Lok Sabha that 75% of the construction work for the hull of the lead carrier had been completed and the carrier would be first launched in December 2011, following which further works would be completed until commissioning. Interior works and fittings on the hull would be carried out until the second half of 2012, when it would again be dry-docked for integration with its propulsion and power generation systems. By late 2012, work commenced for the next stage of construction, which included the installation of the integrated propulsion system, the superstructure, the upper decks, the cabling, sensors and weapons.

Launch

In July 2013, Defence Minister Antony announced that Vikrant would be launched on 12 August at the Cochin Shipyard. The ship was launched by his wife, Elizabeth Antony, on 12 August 2013.

According to Admiral Robin Dhowan, about 83% of the fabrication work and 75% of the construction work had been completed at the time of launching. He said that 90% of the body work of the aircraft carrier had been designed and made in India, about 50% of the propulsion system, and about 30% of its weaponry. He also said that the ship would be equipped with a long range missile system with multi-function radar and a close-in weapon system (CIWS). After the launch, Vikrant would be re-docked for the second phase of construction, in which the ship would be fitted with various weapons and sensors, and the propulsion system, flight deck and the aircraft complex would be integrated.

Undocking and fitting-out

Vikrant was undocked on 10 June 2015 after the completion of structural work. Cabling, piping, heat and ventilation works were scheduled to be completed by 2017 with sea trials to begin thereafter. By October 2015, the construction of the hull was close to 98 percent complete, with flight deck construction underway. The installation of machinery, piping and the propeller shafts was in progress by January 2016; it was reported, however, that there were delays in the delivery of equipment from Russia for the carrier's aviation complex. By May 2017, the carrier's fitting-out was 62% complete, with trials of the auxiliary systems scheduled by late 2017.

In February 2020, all major structural and outfitting work was declared complete.

Harbour and sea trials 

On 31 October 2019, Cochin Shipyard received a  contract for the Phase-III of the project. This contract included funds for the harbour trials, sea trials and support for the ship during its weapons and aviation trials after its delivery. In December 2019, it was reported the engines had been switched on. By September 2020, Vikrant had completed harbour trials while the basin trials started from October 2020 to check propulsion, electric transmission and shafting systems. On 30 November 2020, the basin trials were completed, paving the way for sea trials, the final phase of the IAC-I project.

In April 2021, it was reported work had begun to integrate the long-range surface-to-air missile (LRSAM) onboard Vikrant. On 15 June 2021, Vikrant was moved to the Ernakulam Wharf in Kochi, Kerala. On 4 August 2021, sea trials finally began. The first phase of the sea trials was successfully completed on 8 August 2021. The second phase of the trials was conducted on 24 October 2021, followed by the third phase from 9–17 January 2022, both of which were completed successfully. On 10 July, the fourth and final phase of the sea trials was successfully completed. This phase involved integrated trials of most of the equipment and systems aboard Vikrant, including portions of the Aviation Facilities Complex.

Completion and commissioning
 
Prime Minister Narendra Modi commissioned INS Vikrant on 2 September 2022 in a grand ceremony at Cochin Shipyard. Earlier, INS Vikrant was delivered to the Indian Navy on 28 July 2022. Flight trials of its aircraft complement are expected to be completed by mid-2023, after which the ship will be fully operational. In March 2020, it was revealed that after its commissioning, the Navy will deploy Vikrant at Larsen & Toubro's shipyard in Kattupalli near Chennai. This was done as the planned naval base in Rambilli near Vishakhapatnam was not ready yet. The Navy wants to lease a 260 m berth at Kattupalli shipyard for 8 years between 2022 and 2030 for interim berthing of the ship, by which time the naval base at Rambilli is expected to be available. Naval variant of the Tejas, became the first fixed wing fighter to land and take off from INS Vikrant. This feat was achieved on 6th February 2023.

Commanding officers

Project delays
The IAC project experienced numerous delays. It was planned that after about a year's development in the refit dock, the carrier would be launched when all the major components, including underwater systems, would be in place. Outfitting would then be carried out after launch. Vikrant was intended to be delivered in December 2010 and commissioned in 2016. As per the Cabinet Committee on Security (CCS), sea trials were initially planned to commence in 2013, with the ship to be commissioned in 2014. This was later postponed, with sea trials to begin in 2017 and commissioning planned for 2018. In March 2011, it was reported that the project had been affected by the delay in the delivery of the main gearboxes for the carrier. The supplier, Elecon, attributed it to having to work around a number of technical complexities due to the length of the propulsion shafts. Other issues resulting in delays included an accident with a diesel generator and an issue with its alignment. In July 2012, The Times of India reported that construction of Vikrant had been delayed by three years, and the ship would be ready for commissioning by 2018. Later, in November 2012, Indian English-language news channel NDTV reported that the cost of the aircraft carrier had increased and the delivery has been delayed by at least five years and is expected to be with the Indian Navy only after 2018 as against the scheduled date of delivery of 2014.

In July 2016, the Comptroller & Auditor General (CAG) published a 2014 project plan, supplied by the Cochin Shipyard, that showed an expected completion date in 2023, though the Navy hoped to partially commission the ship before this date. In December 2017, the Chief of Naval Staff Admiral Sunil Lanba announced that the ship was expected to commence sea trials and be commissioned in 2020. In January 2018, Commodore J Chowdhary, the principal director of naval design, announced the remaining procurement delays stalling Vikrants construction had been resolved, and that the carrier would be completed and delivered by December 2018; it would then undergo two years of sea trials before its then-expected commissioning in October 2020.

During the December 2019 Navy Day press briefing, Chief of Naval Staff Admiral Karambir Singh said Vikrant would be fully operational before the end of 2022. A part of the blame for the delay in delivery of Vikrant was attributed to the delay in the supply of aviation equipment from Russia. In response to a question in the Rajya Sabha, Sripad Naik, the Minister of State for Defence, stated: "Ship's targeted delivery was affected due to delay in supply of aviation equipment from Russia". The Navy expected to commission Vikrant by the end of 2021, with an April 2021 report by the Hindustan Times claiming Vikrant, along with the stealth guided missile destroyer , would be delivered to the Indian Navy by the end of 2021. Other construction and procurement delays initially delayed the warship's sea trials to April 2020 from their originally scheduled date of 12 March 2020. Due to the Covid-19 pandemic, trials were further postponed to late 2020, but ultimately began in August 2021. The carrier was commissioned on 2 September 2022.

See also 
Future of the Indian Navy
List of active Indian Navy ships
List of aircraft carriers in service

References

External links

 Delay in equipment from Russia affected the delivery schedule of INS Vikrant
Images during the launch of Vikrant
 Making of Indigenous Aircraft Carrier, Transition to Guardianship: The Indian Navy 1991-2000, Vice Adm (Retd) G M Hiranandani
 Indigenous Aircraft Carrier on Bharat Rakshak

Aircraft carriers of the Indian Navy
2013 ships
Ships built in India